Edmund Marvyn was MP for Petersfield from  1584 to 1593.

References

People from Petersfield
English MPs 1584–1585
English MPs 1586–1587
English MPs 1589